Langthorne is a village and civil parish in Hambleton district of North Yorkshire, England. Like many settlements in the area during the time of the Domesday Book, the land belonged to Count Alan and had just three villagers registered as living there. The name of the village means Tall Thorn-Bush (or tree) and derives from the Old English Lang and þorn.

The population was estimated to be 60 in 2015.

The hamlet used to have two places of worship; the Anglican church was dedicated to St Mary, and the other religious house was a Wesleyan chapel. Both buildings are now private dwellings.

“A Brief and Recent History of Langthorne” was published in May 2021 following a community project. It’s also available online at www.langthornevillage.com

References

Villages in North Yorkshire
Civil parishes in North Yorkshire